Rodrigo Ariel Muniz Menosse (born 1 September 2001) is a Uruguayan footballer.

Career

Muniz started his career with Deportivo Maldonado in the Uruguayan first division.

In 2018, Muniz was sent on loan to the youth academy of Italian second division club Delfino Pescara 1936.

References

External links
 Rodrigo Muniz at Soccerway

Uruguayan footballers
Living people
2001 births
Association football forwards
Deportivo Maldonado players
People from Punta del Este